Helen Elna Hokinson (June 29, 1893 – November 1, 1949) was an American cartoonist and a staff cartoonist for The New Yorker. Over a 20-year span, she contributed 68 covers and more than 1,800 cartoons to The New Yorker.

Life and career

 

She was born in Mendota, Illinois, the daughter of Adolph Hokinson, a farm machinery salesman, and Mary Hokinson, the daughter of Phineas Wilcox, the "Carpenter Orator". She studied at the Academy of Fine Arts (now known as the School of the Art Institute of Chicago), and worked as a freelance fashion illustrator in Chicago for department stores such as Marshall Field's.

In 1920, Hokinson moved to New York City to work as a fashion illustrator and study at the School of Fine and Applied Arts (now Parsons School of Design). Encouraged by an instructor she began submitting comic drawings to magazines, and became one of the first cartoonists to be published in The New Yorker, appearing in the magazine for the first time in the July 4, 1925 issue. She specialized in wealthy, plump, and ditsy society women and their foibles, referring to them as 'My Best Girls', those dowager denizens of woman's clubs, beauty parlors, art galleries, summer resorts and Lane Bryant; they were also popularly known as “Hokinson Women”. According to James Thurber and Brendan Gill, Hokinson relied on the magazine's staff writers to provide captions for her cartoons, a common practice at The New Yorker in the Harold Ross era, until entering into a professional partnership with James Reid Parker in 1931. Hokinson and Parker also provided a monthly cartoon, "The Dear Man," for the Ladies' Home Journal as well as occasional cartoons for advertising campaigns and other magazines.

Hokinson died in the Eastern Airlines Flight 537 mid-air collision at Washington National Airport on November 1, 1949, en route to an appearance at the opening of a Community Chest Drive in DC. She left dozens of cartoons, many of which were published by The New Yorker in subsequent months.

Books
In addition to her own cartoon collections, she also illustrated books by others. Her estate published three volumes of her cartoons during the 1950s.

Bibliography

 

Works by Helen Hokinson
So You're Going to Buy a Book! Minton, Balch & Co. 1931
My Best Girls E. P. Dutton 1941
When Were You Built? E. P. Dutton & Co. 1948
The Ladies, God Bless 'em (memoir by James Reid Parker) E. P. Dutton & Co. 1950
There are Ladies Present E. P. Dutton & Co. 1952
The Hokinson Festival E. P. Dutton & Co. 1956

Illustrated by Helen Hokinson
Edith M. Barber, What Shall I Eat Macmillan 1933
Margaret Fishback, Safe Conduct: When to Behave—And Why The World Publishing Company 1941
Laurence McKinney, Garden Clubs & Spades E. P. Dutton & Co. 1941
Helen Hayes Peffer, Madam Chairman, Members, And Guests Macmillan 1942
Emily Kimbrough, We Followed Our Hearts to Hollywood Grosset & Dunlap 1943
Emily Kimbrough, How Dear to My Heart Dodd, Mead & Co. 1944
Emily Kimbrough, It Gives Me Great Pleasure Dodd, Mead & Co. 1948
Mannix Walker, Everything Rustles Dodd, Mead & Co. 1945

Publications
James Thurber, The Years with Ross, Harper Perennial Modern Classics, New Edition, paperback 2001, .
Brendan Gill, Here at The New Yorker, Da Capo Press, paperback 1997, .

References

External links
Helen Hokinson - Beinecke Library, Yale University
R.C. Harvey, "Helen E. Hokinson" - The Comics Journal - 2013

1893 births
1949 deaths
American women cartoonists
Accidental deaths in Washington, D.C.
The New Yorker cartoonists
School of the Art Institute of Chicago alumni
Victims of aviation accidents or incidents in the United States
Victims of aviation accidents or incidents in 1949
American cartoonists
20th-century American women
20th-century American people